Gabrielle Bou Rached (Arabic: غابريال بو راشد; b. 13 December 1985 in Jezzine) is a Lebanese model, actress and motorcyclist. In 2005 she was crowned Miss Lebanon. After 2015, she shifted her focus on motorcycling and was appointed in 2018 as Director of HOG Abu Dhabi Chapter. In 2021, she was elected as President of HOG GCC. She is the first female Arab biker to achieve King Of The Road/ Bun Burner Gold motorcycle challenge. She featured on the cover of the Harley-Davidson Owners Group Magazine- Issue 1- 2019 (Europe and Asia edition)

Early life and education
Gabrielle Bou Rached (Hometown Jezzine, Lebanon) was born in Beirut in a Christian family. Her mother is from Bteghrine. She modeled during her teenage years, participating in music videos for Arab singers, in television commercials, and in fashion shows. She also had a role (2004) in the Lebanese film Falafel, which was released in 2006, after she had become famous as Miss Lebanon.

In 2007 Gabrielle Bou Rached had roles in two television drama series aired on the LBC Channel: "Wouroud Momazzaka" and "Nar taht al jaleed".{{fact))

Gabrielle Bou Rached studied translation, earning a Master's Degree in Interpretation; she speaks four languages, Arabic, English, French, and Spanish. On 11 October 2009 she married Sami Assaf in a Christian ceremony in Bkerke, Lebanon. They honeymooned in Paris and Madrid. They currently reside in Abu Dhabi, where both are employed by the UAE government.

On February 23, 2011, Gabrielle and Sami's first baby was born, a boy called Robin.
On November 4, 2012, their second baby, Alexia was born.

Modeling
February 2004, Gabrielle was crowned as Miss ETIB at The School of Translation and Interpretation in USJ University Beirut.
May 2005, Gabrielle was crowned Miss Campus of USJ University Beirut.
Summer 2005, Gabrielle represented Lebanon in the Miss Asia Pageant where she won the Miss Intellect Award and placed 2nd in the Best National Costume Award. She also made the top 8 in the pageant, the only Miss Lebanon to do so.
May 2006, Gabrielle participated in the Miss Universe 2006 pageant in Los Angeles, California, the first Miss Asia contestant to compete at Miss Lebanon and win.

Acting

 Falafel (Movie, 2005)
 Wouroud Moumazzaka (Drama series, 2007)
 Nar That Al Jaleed (Drama series, 2008)

References

External links
Gabrielle Bou Rached's Homepage

1985 births
Living people
People from Matn District
Eastern Orthodox Christians from Lebanon
Miss Universe 2006 contestants
Lebanese female models
Lebanese expatriates in the United Arab Emirates
Lebanese beauty pageant winners
People from Jezzine
People from South Lebanon
Actresses from Beirut